Gavin Kaysen (born 1979 in Thousand Oaks, California) is executive chef and owner of Spoon and Stable, Bellecour Bakery, Demi, Socca, and Mara all in Minneapolis. He received the James Beard Award for Best Chef: Midwest in 2018. Previous to his move to Minneapolis, he served as Executive Chef and Director of Culinary Operations for Daniel Boulud in New York City, over seeing Café Boulud in Palm Beach, Toronto and New York City.

He previously headed the kitchen at El Bizcocho in San Diego. In 2007, he represented U.S.A. at the Bocuse d'Or. He was a competitor on The Next Iron Chef, eliminated during the third challenge, "Resourcefulness".

Career
A graduate of the New England Culinary Institute, Kaysen was inspired to become a chef while working at a Subway in Bloomington, Minnesota:

In 2007, Kaysen was named one of the top 10 ‘Best New Chefs’ by Food & Wine. Before becoming executive chef at Cafe Boulud, he worked at Domaine Chandon in Yountville, California, under Robert Curry, at Auberge de Lavaux in Lausanne, Switzerland, and under Marco Pierre White at L'Escargot in London, England.

Chef Kaysen was eliminated during the third episode of The Next Iron Chef due to his food being under-seasoned and under-salted, according to the judges. After the elimination, he explained to judge Michael Ruhlman that the problem had been that the food had been stored improperly by the tech crew of the show, and had become submerged in an ice water bath, leaching out the salt and seasonings. Ruhlman has stated that had he known of the technical glitch, he would likely have judged differently.

In 2008, Chef Kaysen won a James Beard Foundation Award for Rising Star Chef of the Year.

Kaysen opened his first restaurant, Spoon and Stable, in the North Loop neighborhood of Minneapolis in November of 2014. It was named a 2015 Restaurant of the Year by Food & Wine, a Best New Restaurant by Bon Appetit, and was a 2015 James Beard Award Finalist for Best New Restaurant. 

In March of 2017, he opened Bellecour in Wayzata, MN. The restaurant was named for a historic square in Lyon, France, the birthplace of two of his mentors: Daniel Boulud and Paul Bocuse. In 2018, the James Beard Awards named him Best Chef: Midwest. Kaysen closed Bellecour in 2020, citing effects of the COVID-19 pandemic. Its bakery component has relocated to open in Cooks of Crocus Hill store locations in Minneapolis and St. Paul, Minnesota.

Kaysen collaborated with chef Andrew Zimmern in 2017 to form KZ ProVisioning, originally conceived as a collaboration between the NHL's Minnesota Wild and later expanded to include partnerships with the Minnesota Timberwolves and the Minnesota Lynx. Through this program, meals are prepared for professional athletes in accordance with players' physiological needs. 

Kaysen opened his third restaurant, the 20-seat tasting menu venue Demi, in 2019. It was a James Beard Award Finalist for Best New Restaurant in 2020.

A virtual cooking class series called GK at Home, was created during the winter of 2020, a pivot while his restaurants were closed during the COVID-19 pandemic. It continues to this day.

His fourth restaurant, Mara, serves Mediterranean cuisine and opened in the Four Seasons Hotel Minneapolis alongside Socca, a casual café.

Bocuse d'Or incident
The Bocuse d'Or is one of the world's most prestigious cooking competitions, held in France every two years, and is often referred to as the Olympics of cooking. Kaysen was the U.S. candidate for the 2007 finals.  While other issues caused problems for Kaysen at the Bocuse d'Or, the main failing was caused by a dishwashing assistant. Kaysen prepared a wheel-shaped ballotine of chicken, inlaid with chicken liver, foie gras, and Louisiana crayfish. Two of the side dishes were missing. Mistaking two chicken wings intended for the platter as rejects, the dishwasher had eaten them. Kaysen placed fourteenth.

Television appearances
The Next Iron Chef, 2007
Iron Chef America, 2009 - participant
Top Chef, 2009 (season 6) - guest judge

Books
Gavin Launched a self published book in October 2022 called At Home..

References

1979 births
Living people
American male chefs
American television chefs
People from San Diego
People from Thousand Oaks, California